The Euroleague Basketball Next Generation Tournament is an international boy's youth age basketball tournament that is contested between the best basketball clubs in Europe in the Under-18 age category. The tournament is organized by Euroleague Basketball, and is sponsored by Adidas. The tournament's Final Four takes place during the senior men's EuroLeague Final Four event. The tournaments's Final Four also features a slam dunk contest and 3 point shootout contest.

History
The first Next Generation Tournament Final Four was held in 2003, in Barcelona, Spain. The tournament was originally officially called the Euroleague Basketball International Junior Tournament and was sponsored by Nike. Its sponsorship name was originally the Nike International Junior Tournament (NIJT). Originally, the tournament featured only 8 teams in total. In 2014, the name of the tournament was officially changed to the Euroleague Basketball Next Generation Tournament, and Adidas took over as the tournament's main sponsor. Thus, the tournament's new sponsorship name became the Adidas Next Generation Tournament.

The four regional tournaments were originally the Torneo Città di Roma, the Torneig de Bàsquet Junior Ciutat de L'Hospitalet, the Kaunas International Junior Tournament, and the Belgrade International Junior Tournament. In 2016, the Torneo Città di Roma was replaced by the Torneo Costa del Sol.

Format
In total, 34 teams compete to play for the Next Generation Tournament title, at the Next Generation Tournament Final Four. 32 teams compete in 4 regional tournaments, in order to qualify to the 8 team Final Four qualification tournament. The regional tournaments are the Torneig de Bàsquet Junior Ciutat de L'Hospitalet, the Kaunas International Junior Tournament, the Belgrade International Junior Tournament, and the Torneo Costa del Sol. The winners of each of the 4 regional tournaments qualify to the Final Four qualification tournament.

In addition to the 4 winners of each of the regional qualification tournaments, the reigning champion from the previous season, as well as three wild card invitees, also take part in the Final Tournament, which is played by eight teams that are divided into two groups of four teams each. The two group winners play on the same court where the senior men's EuroLeague Final Four is held.

Finals

Performances

Performance by club

Performance by country

See also 
 Junior ABA League
 VTB United Youth League
 EuroLeague
 EuroCup

References

External links 
Next Generation Tournament Webpage
Euroleague Basketball Official Website
EuroLeague Official Website

 
EuroLeague
Next Generation Tournament
Youth basketball competitions
European youth sports competitions